is a Japanese footballer currently playing as a forward for Roasso Kumamoto.

Club career
In January 2023, Michiwaki became the youngest player to sign a professional contract with J2 League side Roasso Kumamoto, at the age of sixteen. The following month he made his professional debut, coming on as a substitute for Shohei Aihara in a 1–1 draw with Tochigi SC.

International career
Michiwaki has represented Japan at under-16 level.

Career statistics

Club
.

Notes

References

2006 births
Living people
Association football people from Kumamoto Prefecture
Japanese footballers
Japan youth international footballers
Association football forwards
J2 League players
Roasso Kumamoto players